The Free State Division of the High Court of South Africa (previously named the Orange Free State Provincial Division and the Free State High Court, and commonly known as the Bloemfontein High Court) is a superior court of law with general jurisdiction over the Free State province of South Africa. The division sits at Bloemfontein.

History
A High Court of Justice consisting of three judges was established as the superior court of the independent Orange Free State in 1875. This court ceased to exist as a result of the Anglo-Boer War; with the British victory the Orange Free State became the Orange River Colony, and a new High Court was established for the colony. When the Union of South Africa was formed in 1910 this court became the Orange Free State Provincial Division of the Supreme Court of South Africa. In 1997, on the adoption of the current Constitution of South Africa, it became a High Court, and in 2009 it was renamed the Free State High Court by the Renaming of High Courts Act. In 2013, in the restructuring brought about by the Superior Courts Act, it became the Free State Division of the High Court of South Africa.

References

External links
 Decisions of the Free State Division
 Free State High Court at the University of the Free State website

High Court of South Africa
High Court
Bloemfontein
1875 establishments in the Orange Free State
Courts and tribunals established in 1875